Kampa Park, or Park Kampa, is a park on Kampa Island, in the Vltava, in Prague, Czech Republic.

See also

 Réva (sculpture)

References

External links
 

Parks in Prague
Malá Strana